An Information Sharing and Analysis Center or (ISAC) is a nonprofit organization that provides a central resource for gathering information on cyber and related threats to critical infrastructure and providing two-way sharing of information between the private and public sector.

Sector ISACs began forming in 1999, subsequent to the May 22, 1998 signing of U.S. Presidential Decision Directive-63 (PDD-63), when "the federal government asked each critical infrastructure sector to establish sector-specific organizations to share information about threats and vulnerabilities." Decision Directive-63 (PDD-63) was replaced by Homeland Security Presidential Directive 21 in 2013.

Canada 
 Global Mining and Metals Information Sharing & Analysis Centre (MM-ISAC)

Europe 
European Energy - Information Sharing & Analysis Centre (EE-ISAC) is a network of private utilities, solution providers and (semi) public institutions such as academia, governmental and non-profit organizations which share valuable information on cyber resilience to strengthen the cyber security of the European Power Grid.

India 
In India, the Information Sharing and Analysis Center (ISAC) operates as an independent non-profit organization that works closely as Public-Private-Partner (PPP) with apex nodal agency for cyber security, National Critical Information Infrastructure Protection Center (NCIIPC), designated under the IT Act Law 2000.

Japan 
 Financials ISAC Japan
 ICT Information Sharing And Analysis Center Japan
 Japan Elecricity Information Sharing and Analysis Center
 Japan Foreign Trade Council ISAC
 Medical ISAC Japan Cyber Security Service (MICSS)
 Transportation ISAC JAPAN

United States 
The National Council of ISACs (NCI Directorate) members include:

 Automotive (Auto-ISAC)
 Aviation (A-ISAC)
 Communications ISAC (NCC)
 Defense Industrial Base (DIB-ISAC)
 Emergency Services (EMR-ISAC)
 Electricity (E-ISAC)
 Energy Analytic Security Exchange (EASE)
 Elections Infrastructure ISAC (EI-ISAC)
 Financial Services (FS-ISAC)
 Healthcare Ready
 Health 
 Information Technology (IT-ISAC)
 Maritime Security ISAC 
 Media and Entertainment Sharing Analysis Center (ME-ISAC)  
 Nuclear (NEI)
 Oil and Gas (ONG-ISAC)
 Public Transit (PT-ISAC)
 Real Estate (RE-ISAC)
 Research & Education Network (REN-ISAC)
 Retail & Hospitality ISAC (RH-ISAC) Formerly R-CISC
 Space ISAC (S-ISAC) 
 Supply Chain (SC-ISAC)
 Surface Transportation (ST-ISAC)
 Water ISAC (Water-ISAC)

Many other ISACs exist beyond the National Council of ISACS, which caters only to sectors the US government has declared Critical Infrastructure sectors, such as MFG-ISAC and LS-ISAC.

References 

Computer security organizations
National Security Agency